Susana Díaz Pacheco (born 18 October 1974, Seville, Spain) is a Spanish politician from Andalusia and a leading figure in the Spanish Socialist Workers' Party (PSOE) as the former leader of the Andalusian PSOE-A.

She served as the President of Andalusia until January 2019, having acceded to the presidency following José Antonio Griñán's resignation in 2013, and was subsequently re-elected in Andalusia's 2015 regional election. Until July 2021, she served as the Secretary-General of the Andalusian branch of PSOE.

From 2016 she combined her regional roles with aspirations to the national leadership of the party. Following her defeat to Pedro Sánchez in the 2017 PSOE leadership elections, she has continued with her regional responsibilities.

Early life
Susana Díaz was born the eldest child to José Díaz, a plumber in the Seville City Council, and his wife, Rosa Pacheco, a housewife with whom he had three other daughters, Diana, Rocío and Laura. She has a child named José María.

She studied law at the University of Seville and finished her degree after ten years.

Early political career
Susana Díaz was elected secretary of Organisation of Socialist Youth of Andalusia in 1997. In the elections of June 1999 she was included in the list of the PSOE to the City of Seville and was elected as councillor and, Alfredo Sánchez Monteseirín as mayor.

Susana Díaz studied law at the University of Seville.

Congresswoman and Senator (2004–2012) 
After her time with the Socialist Youth, she held various political positions (deputy for Seville in the Congress of Deputies between 2004 and 2008, deputy for Seville in the Parliament of Andalusia since 2008, and senator for Andalusia between 2011 and 2012) and organic positions within the PSOE (organisational secretary of the PSOE in Seville between 2004 and 2010 and of the PSOE in Andalusia from March 2010 to July 2012).

Councillor for the Presidency and Equality of the Junta de Andalucía (2012–2013) 
On 6 May 2012, José Antonio Griñán placed her at the head of the Ministry of Presidency and Equality in the Junta de Andalucía. She was Secretary General of the PSOE in Seville between 14 July, 201215 and 30 November 2013.

President of Andalusia (2013–2019)
Díaz was elected as President of Andalusia in 2013, ruling in coalition with the left-wing United Left party.

Role in Pedro Sánchez's first leadership election 
In the aftermath of 2014 European Parliament election in Spain, PSOE's national leader Alfredo Pérez Rubalcaba resigned and a leadership contest was held. Díaz, who still had not won any major election, did not run, but a coalition of regional leaders including herself, opposed the candidacy of early front-runner Eduardo Madina, who was seen as Rubalcaba's heir, and supported a change in the party's policies. These regional leaders backed Economics Ph.D. Pedro Sánchez to become the party's new leader, what eventually happened, with Sánchez winning a majority of the party member's vote. As a setoff, critical regional leaders entered PSOE's executive committee.

Second term 
Following a disagreement with the United Left, she called for early elections, which were held in 2015.

For the 2015 Andalusian parliamentary election, Díaz led a forceful campaign against Prime Minister Mariano Rajoy and the austerity cuts imposed by the national government. During the campaign, she also insisted that the Socialists would not form alliances with the People's Party or Podemos if the vote failed to produce a clear-cut winner.

In the election, Díaz's party retained the same number of seats as prior to the election – 47 – although the election was considered a victory for the PSOE, as it became once again the most voted party in Andalusia, since the Popular party lost 17 seats and its former coalition partner, United Left, lost 7 seats. The new parties, Podemos (left wing) and Citizens (centre-right), gained 15 and 9 seats, respectively and, after a long period of three-way negotiations with both parties, Diaz came to an agreement with Citizens to reach the 55 seats needed for a majority. In early May 2015, her government received 56 votes for her investiture through an agreement with C's, thus being re-elected as regional President.

Role in the 2015–16 Spanish government formation and 2016 PSOE crisis 
A general election was held in Spain in December 2015. Prime Minister Mariano Rajoy won the most seats, but refused to form a government since more than a half of the Congress of Deputies were hostile to him. King Felipe VI then invited runner-up Pedro Sánchez to form a government; however, Díaz and her coalition of regional leaders barred Sánchez from creating a coalition government with third-placed left-wing populist Podemos and forcing him to make a deal with center, fourth-placed Citizens. However, this deal did not add up for a majority, general elections were repeated and Rajoy stood as caretaker prime minister. Díaz warned Sánchez that the party would not tolerate another electoral loss.

In the election repeat, PSOE maintained the second place and lost five seats, while Rajoy's PP won and gained 14 seats; however, counting PSOE, still more than a half of Congress was still hostile to Rajoy. The King invited Rajoy to form a government. Despite this and Sánchez's second defeat, he was confident he could form a government with all 180 (out of 350) deputies who wanted Rajoy out, including Podemos, Catalan and Basque separatists; while Díaz soundly affirmed PSOE should stay in opposition and let Rajoy stay in office. This, added to more defeats of PSOE in Galicia and Basque Country regional election, being overtaken by Podemos-led alliances and polling record low results, prompted dissenters—led by Susana Díaz—to call for Sánchez's immediate resignation  and led to a party crisis. Sánchez challenged his critics to defeat him in a primary election;, however, by 1 October, he had lost control of the executive committee and the Federal Committee, and resigned as party leader and MP. A caretaker committee led by Asturian president Javier Fernández Fernández ordered all PSOE MPs to abstain in order to allow Rajoy to remain in office, as the alternative was a third election, not wanted by the caretaker committee as opinion polls predicted a PP landslide and PSOE overtaken by Podemos. Only 15 PSOE MPs broke party discipline and voted against Rajoy.

Failed attempt to become national PSOE leader 
Díaz submitted her bid for the 2017 PSOE leadership election, along with Pedro Sánchez and Patxi López. Three former party leaders, Felipe González, José Luis Rodríguez Zapatero and Alfredo Pérez Rubalcaba, as well as several former PSOE ministers and regional leaders backed her. Sánchez successfully returned to PSOE's leadership with a 10-point difference over Díaz in the membership vote, took full control of the party and removed all his critics from the party's executive. Former and regional leaders' support proved to be more of a burden rather than a boost for Díaz, as this was exploited by Sánchez to tick her as the establishment's candidate, gaining support from the party's grassroots.

2018 snap election and exit of regional power 
In May 2018, national PSOE leader Pedro Sánchez filed a vote of no confidence in the government of Mariano Rajoy that placed him as Prime Minister of Spain with the support of Podemos and Catalan and Basque nationalist parties. Citizens, Diaz's partner in Andalusia and being a party which strongly opposes these movements, withdrew their support to PSOE and Díaz, triggering a snap election. In the 2018 Andalusian regional election support for Diaz's socialist party dropped to 33 seats, losing 14 from the previous election. Once again her political party was the most voted in Andalusia, but Susana Diaz could lose presidency of Andalusia if the People's Party and Citizens join forces with VOX; a new political party without previous representation that retrieved 12 seats and was labelled by Diaz as "far-right".

See also
 Second Susana Díaz government

References

External links

 Ficha de Susana Díaz en el Parlamento de Andalucía
 Perfil de Susana Díaz

|-

|-

1974 births
Leaders of political parties in Spain
Living people
Presidents of the Regional Government of Andalusia
Spanish Socialist Workers' Party politicians
University of Seville alumni
Seville city councillors
21st-century Spanish women politicians
Members of the 8th Parliament of Andalusia
Members of the 9th Parliament of Andalusia
Members of the 10th Parliament of Andalusia
Members of the 11th Parliament of Andalusia
Women presidents of the autonomous communities of Spain